Luta Mae (Cornelius) McGrath (November 21, 1907 - April 14, 2016) was an officer in the United States Army Ordnance Corps and the oldest surviving female veteran of World War II at the time of her death. In the Army Ordnance community, McGrath became known as "The First Lady of Ordnance" and was the first woman to be inducted into the Ordnance Corps Hall of Fame in 1985.

Career
McGrath joined the Women's Army Auxiliary Corps as a private in 1943.

References

External links
https://goordnance.army.mil/hof/hall_of_fame.html

1907 births
2016 deaths
American centenarians
Burials at Arlington National Cemetery
People from Lee County, Kentucky
Women centenarians
Female United States Army officers
Women's Army Corps soldiers